Alexander Cielma Miliarakis (born 30 March 2001), known professionally as Greekazo, is a Swedish rapper.
 Greekazo grew up in Hässelby in Stockholm and was born to parents of Polish and Greek background. 

Greekazo started his career on 31 July 2019, with the music single "HotSpot", which has received over 23 million streams on Spotify.

His other songs have been streamed over 60 million times on Spotify. He released his debut studio album Gör nu, tänk sen on 30 March 2020, which peaked at number three on the Swedish Albums Chart.

In December 2019, Greekazo appeared in a much publicized interview with Malou von Sivers on her talkshow Malou efter tio broadcast on TV4. He had been invited to talk about his career, but the interview soon turned into questions about his views on criminality and drugs. The interview received a lot of criticism and a debate about if one person can be held accountable for crime sprees in the suburbs. Greekazo later received an invitation to come back to the show for another interview, but denied the request, since he believed he didn't have the need to "prove anything".

Discography

Albums

Singles

Featured singles

Other charted songs

Notes

References

External links 

2001 births
Living people
Singers from Stockholm
Swedish rappers
Swedish people of Greek descent
Swedish_people_of_Polish_descent